Elmer E. Johnston (November 22, 1898 – December 4, 1985) was an American politician in the state of Washington. He served in the Washington House of Representatives from 1947 to 1966 for District 6.

References

1985 deaths
1898 births
Republican Party members of the Washington House of Representatives